Omicron Arietis, Latinised from ο Arietis, is the Bayer designation for a single, blue-white-hued star in the northern constellation of Aries. It has an apparent visual magnitude of +5.78, which means it is dimly visible to the naked eye. Based upon an annual parallax shift of 5.49 mas as seen from Earth, it is located roughly 590 light-years from the Sun. At that distance, the visual magnitude of the star is diminished by an extinction factor of 0.22 due to interstellar dust.

This is a B-type main-sequence star with a stellar classification of B9 Vn. The 'n' suffix indicates that it has nebulous absorption lines in its spectrum, which are caused by the Doppler effect and rapid rotation. Indeed, it has a projected rotational velocity of 225 km/s. The star has an estimated 3.45 times the mass of the Sun and about 3.1 times the Sun's radius.

References

External links
 HR 809
 Image Omicron Arietis

B-type main-sequence stars
Arietis, Omicron
Aries (constellation)
BD+14 0457
Arietis, 37
017036
012803
0809